Erik Sjöberg may refer to:
Erik Sjöberg (poet)
Erik Sjöberg (historian)

See also
Lars-Erik Sjöberg